Jennett Humphreys (17 April 1829 –  6 February 1917) was a British author, poet, and contributor to major reference works.

Humphreys was from Cricklewood, a district in North London, to a Scottish father, Griffith Humphreys, and English mother, Sarah Leggett Humphreys. As a reader she supplied numerous quotations and other information for entries in the Oxford English Dictionary, much of which was a by-product of research for an unpublished book on the early history of cooking, and wrote an article on the OED for Fraser's Magazine. She was the author of many articles in the Dictionary of National Biography.

References

External links

1829 births
1917 deaths
English lexicographers
English biographers